Maxime Luycx (born 18 September 1982) is a Belgian field hockey player.  At the 2008 and 2012 Summer Olympics, he competed for the national team in the men's tournament. He played as a midfielder for Belgian hockey club Waterloo Ducks.

References

External links
 

1982 births
Living people
Belgian male field hockey players
Male field hockey midfielders
2002 Men's Hockey World Cup players
Field hockey players at the 2008 Summer Olympics
Field hockey players at the 2012 Summer Olympics
Olympic field hockey players of Belgium
Waterloo Ducks H.C. players
Men's Belgian Hockey League players